This is a list of people (real or fictional) appearing on the cover of Rolling Stone magazine in the 2010s. This list is for the regular biweekly, and later monthly, issues of the magazine, including variant covers, and does not include special issues. Issue numbers that include a slash (XXX/YYY) are combined double issues.

2010

2011

2012

{| class="wikitable sortable" style="margin:auto;width:100%;"
|- style="background:#ccf;"
! style="width:10%;"|Issue number!! style="width:15%;" |Cover date!! style="width:50%;" |People on cover!! style="width:25%;" |Notes
|-
|1148||January 19, 2012||The Black Keys (Dan Auerbach, Patrick Carney)||
|-
|1149||February 2, 2012||David Bowie||
|-
|1150||February 16, 2012||The Voice cast (Christina Aguilera, Cee Lo Green, Adam Levine, Blake Shelton)||
|-
|1151||March 1, 2012||Paul McCartney||
|-
|1152||March 15, 2012||Whitney Houston||
|-
|1153||March 29, 2012||Bruce Springsteen||
|-
|1154||April 12, 2012||Jennifer Lawrence||
|-
|1155||April 26, 2012||Radiohead (Colin Greenwood, Jonny Greenwood, Ed O'Brien, Phil Selway, Thom Yorke)||
|-
|1156||May 10, 2012||Barack Obama||
|-
|1157||May 24, 2012||Peter Dinklage||
|-
|1158||June 7, 2012||Adam Yauch||
|-
|1159||June 21, 2012||Charlie Sheen||
|-
|1160/1161||July 5–19, 2012||deadmau5||
|-
|1162||August 2, 2012||Justin Bieber||
|-
|1163||August 16, 2012||Breaking Bad cast (Bryan Cranston, Aaron Paul)||
|-
|1164||August 30, 2012||Rick Ross||
|-
|1165||September 13, 2012||Mitt Romney||
|-
|1166||September 27, 2012||Bob Dylan||
|-
|1167||October 11, 2012||Adele (front cover), Amy Heidemann (back cover)||Heidemann appeared on the cover after her group Karmin won Rolling Stone'''s "Women Who Rock" cover contest
|-
|1168||October 25, 2012||Taylor Swift||The Hot List 2012
|-
|1169||November 8, 2012||Barack Obama||
|-
|1170||November 22, 2012||Daniel Craig (front cover), Pitbull (back cover)||
|-
|1171||December 6, 2012||Jimmy Page||
|-
|rowspan="4"|1172/1173||rowspan="4"|December 20, 2012 – January 3, 2013||Eminem||rowspan="4"|"The 50 Greatest Hip-Hop Songs of All Time" cover story
|-
|Jay-Z
|-
|The Notorious B.I.G.
|-
|Tupac Shakur
|}

2013

2014

2015

2016

2017

2018

2019

References

Sources
 Rolling Stone Coverwall 1967–2013
 Rolling Stone: 50 Years of Covers: A History of the Most Influential Magazine in Pop Culture'', New York, NY: Abrams, 2018. 

Lists of actors
Lists of entertainers
Lists of musicians
2010s